Michael Geserer (born 14 December 1969) is a former professional tennis player from Germany.

Biography
Born in Regensburg, Geserer only started playing tennis at the age of 17. After graduating from high school in 1989 he did a year of military service, before turning professional in 1991.

During his career he reached a highest ranking of 189 in the world and featured in the qualifying draws of all four grand slam tournaments.

His best performances on the ATP Tour were appearances in the round of 16 at the 1995 Arizona Tennis Championships and 1995 Dutch Open, eliminated by Stefan Edberg in the former.

He formerly coached WTA Tour player Julia Görges, and 2021 Australian Open finalist Jennifer Brady.

Challenger titles

Doubles: (1)

References

External links
 
 

1969 births
Living people
German male tennis players
German tennis coaches
Sportspeople from Regensburg
Tennis people from Bavaria